Pietro Pezzati (1828–1890) was an Italian painter.

Born in Tuscany, he was a resident of Livorno. He exhibited at the Promotrice of Florence: Il mio diletto a me ed io a lui and a Holy Family. In 1886, at the Exhibition of Livorno, he displayed another  depicting: ''Virgin and Child'. Pezzati mainly painted sacred subjects.

He painted the altarpiece of San Giovanni Gualberto in prayer visited by the Divine Light (1856) found in the Chapel of San Giovanni Gualberto located near Tavarnelle Val di Pesa.

References

1828 births
1898 deaths
19th-century Italian painters
Italian male painters
Painters from Tuscany
People from Prato
19th-century Italian male artists